Birmingham Rewound is an ongoing non-profit website to collect memories from the Birmingham, Alabama area. The site was set up in January 2005 following the response from the Birmingham area. Russell Wells is the webmaster and Tim Hollis assists with local data and historical information. Tim Hollis has written several books on the Birmingham area and Southeast Culture. Monthly features appear on the Birmingham Rewound website on various topics of local interest and local newspaper articles and memories. The site has over 10,000 hits a month from around the world. The Alabama Broadcasters Association has also linked to this site as being an excellent database of Huntsville Metro TV/radio information.

See also
Huntsville Rewound, a spin-off site, covers the Huntsville metropolitan area
Atlanta Rewound, a spin-off site, covers the Atlanta metropolitan area
Alabama Broadcasters Association maintain a database of Birmingham-area TV/radio information.

References

External links 
  Birmingham Rewound Website

Culture of Birmingham, Alabama
History websites of the United States